Mary Alice Thatch (July 6, 1943 – December 28, 2021) was an American newspaper editor. She was the editor and publisher of the Wilmington Journal, the oldest black newspaper in North Carolina. She played a key role in the pardon of the Wilmington Ten.

References

1943 births
2021 deaths
20th-century African-American women
20th-century African-American people
21st-century African-American women
People from Wilmington, North Carolina